The 1905 LSU Tigers football team represented the LSU Tigers of Louisiana State University during the 1905 Southern Intercollegiate Athletic Association football season.

Schedule

References

LSU
LSU Tigers football seasons
College football undefeated seasons
LSU Tigers football